Janusz Przymanowski (1922–1998) was a Polish translator. He wrote the novel Four Tank-Men and a Dog.

1922 births
1998 deaths
Polish United Workers' Party members
Polish Workers' Party politicians
Polish people of World War II
Polish translators
20th-century translators
Recipient of the Meritorious Activist of Culture badge